Cambooya was a Legislative Assembly electorate in the state of Queensland, Australia.

History
Cambooya was created by the Electoral Districts Act of 1887, taking effect at the 1888 elections. It was based on the Western Downs area.

Cambooya was abolished at the 1912 elections, renamed the Electoral district of Pittsworth.

Members

The following people were elected in the seat of Cambooya:

See also
 Electoral districts of Queensland
 Members of the Queensland Legislative Assembly by year
 :Category:Members of the Queensland Legislative Assembly by name

References

Former electoral districts of Queensland
1888 establishments in Australia
1912 disestablishments in Australia
Constituencies established in 1888
Constituencies disestablished in 1912